The Schechter Letter, also called the Genizah Letter or Cambridge Document, was discovered in the Cairo Geniza by Solomon Schechter in 1912. It is an anonymous Khazar letter from the Genizah of Cairo, discussing several matters including the wars of the early 940s, involving the Byzantine Empire, the Khazar Khaganate, and Kievan Rus'. Scholars have debated its authenticity.

The Letter

The Schechter Letter has been interpreted as a communique from an unnamed Khazar author to an unidentified Jewish dignitary. Some believe that the Schechter Letter was addressed to Hasdai ibn Shaprut by a Constantinopolitan Khazar after his first, unsuccessful attempt to correspond with the Khazar king Joseph (see Khazar Correspondence). However recent historiography has noted the names echoing Jewish mystical traditions and lack of any corroborating historical sources to its account may place it in a tradition of fantastical writing about the lost tribes of Israel.

The Letter was included in the Genizah Collection donated by Schechter to Cambridge University in 1898. Most of the folio is unreadable and only two surviving blocs of text exist. This makes identifying the precise nature of the letter, communique or legend unclear.

The conversion text

The Schechter Letter contains an account of the Khazar conversion that differs from that of the Khazar Correspondence and the Kuzari. In the Schechter Letter account, Jews from Persia and Armenia migrated to Khazaria to flee persecution, where they mingled with the nomadic Khazars, eventually assimilating almost totally. Then a strong war-leader arose (in the Schechter Letter, he is named Sabriel), who succeeded in having himself named ruler of the Khazars. Sabriel happened to be remotely descended from the early Jewish settlers, and his wife Serakh convinced him to adopt Judaism, in which his people followed him. What follows in the Letter is largely lost except for a few fragments.

The account of the Khazar kingdom matches up with no Muslim, Jewish or Byzantine source from the period regarding wars of migration. It also differs radically from every other alleged source on the Khazar conversion to Judaism and in its naming of the ruling class. The names of the figures involved, Sabriel being the name of an angel in the Jewish mystical tradition, Serah being a biblical figure and the claim of descent from the tribe of Simeon whose demise is chronicled in the bible, strongly indicate the text is an unreliable source and heavily influenced in a rich Jewish tradition of wish fulfilment and mystical writing about the ten lost tribes of Israel.

HLGW and Romanus

The next substantial section of the Letter to survive tells of a recent (to the author) event - an invasion of Khazaria by HLGW (most probably Oleg), prince (knyaz) of Rus, instigated by the Byzantine Emperor Romanus I Lecapenus. Romanus, a persecutor of the Jews, may have been seeking to counter Khazar retaliation for his policies. According to the Letter, HLGW was defeated by the Khazar general Pesakh in the Taman region. Faced with execution by the Khazars, HLGW agreed to attack Constantinople (indeed, such an attack took place in 941), where he was defeated and fled to Persia, where he died. If Oleg is indeed Helgi (HLGW) and participated in these wars, the Geninah Letter is at odds with the Primary Chronicle, claims Oleg died in 912, while the Novgorod First Chronicle claims he died in 922.

Implications of the text

If taken literally and not as a legend of lost tribes, the letter challenges the conventional narrative of the Khazars. First, its version of the conversion posits a partially Judean descent for Khazar contemporaries of the author. Whether or not this is an accurate account, it indicates that the Khazars saw themselves as fully integrated members of world Jewry.

The letter states that in the early days after Khazars' conversion to Judaism, some Alanians already practised Judaism, to a degree that Alania came to save Khazaria from its enemies (lines 52–53). This is the only evidence corroborating the record of Benjamin of Tudela about Judaism in Alania.

In addition, if HLGW in the text refers to Oleg (Helgi), and he participated in these wars, the Genizah Letter would be at odds with the Primary Chronicle, which claims Oleg died in 912, while the Novgorod First Chronicle claims he died in 922. Instead of his successor Igor of Kiev reigning from 912 until his murder in 944, as the Primary Chronicle claims, Constantine Zuckerman (1995) concluded that Igor only reigned from the summer of 941 to the winter of 945. In the years prior, many scholars had disregarded the Schechter Letter account; Zuckerman has suggested that the Schechter Letter's account is in harmony with various other Rus' sources, and it suggests a struggle within the early Rus polity between factions loyal to Oleg and to Igor, a struggle that Oleg ultimately lost. Zuckerman posited that the early chronology of the Rus' had to be re-determined in light of these sources. Among the beliefs of Zuckerman and others who have analyzed these sources are that the Khazars did not lose Kiev until the early 10th century (rather than 882, the traditional date), that Igor was not Rurik's son but rather a more distant descendant, and that Oleg did not immediately follow Rurik, but rather that there is a lost generation between the legendary Varangian lord and his documented successors.

Further reading

References

External links
Bibliography of Khazar Studies
Khazar Self Perception: A Study of the Schechter Text

Khazar diplomacy and documents
Manuscripts from the Cairo Geniza
Manuscripts in Cambridge